Loco is an orchestral composition in one movement by the American composer Jennifer Higdon.  The work was commissioned by the Ravinia Festival of Highland Park, Illinois to commemorate the Ravinia train as part of the Train Commission Project.  It was first performed on July 31, 2004, at the Ravinia Festival by the Chicago Symphony Orchestra.

Composition
Loco has a duration of roughly 8 minutes and is composed in a single movement.  Higdon described her inspiration for the piece in the score program notes, writing:

Instrumentation
The work is scored for an orchestra comprising two flutes, piccolo, three oboes, three clarinets, two bassoons, contrabassoon, four French horns, three trumpets, three trombones, tuba, piano, timpani, three percussionists, and strings.

Reception
Jeremy Eichler of The Boston Globe described Loco as "a gleaming and rambunctious curtain-raiser".  Scott Cantrell of The Dallas Morning News similarly called it "seven minutes of high-energy scurries, clatters, chatters, jabs, chugs and fanfares."  Andrew Druckenbrod of the Pittsburgh Post-Gazette wrote, "This piece imitates a "fast-moving train," and it roared into the hall. The fanfare-like work filled every nook and cranny with rhythmic pulsing and walls of sound."  He added:

See also
List of compositions by Jennifer Higdon

References

Compositions by Jennifer Higdon
2004 compositions
Compositions for symphony orchestra